The JCPM Yakiimo Station is an astronomical observatory station at Shimizu, Shizuoka prefecture, Japan.

It has the following observatory code: IAU-Observatory, Code 885.

It was at the JCPM Yakiimo Station that on November 23, 1990, Japanese astronomers Akira Natori and Takeshi Urata discovered the asteroid 6042 Cheshirecat.

Other JCPM stations 
 JCPM Hamatonbetsu Station (394)
 JCPM Kimachi Station (891) 
 JCPM Oi Station (882)
 JCPM Sakura Station (393)
 JCPM Sapporo Station (392)
 JCPM Tone Station (890)

Astronomical observatories in Japan